Kąty Opolskie  (German Konty) is a village in the administrative district of Gmina Tarnów Opolski, within Opole County, Opole Voivodeship, in south-western Poland.

The village has a population of 952.

References

Villages in Opole County